Bafq County is in Yazd province, Iran. The capital of the county is the city of Bafq. At the 2006 census, the county's population was 51,507 in 13,307 households. The following census in 2011 counted 41,876 people in 12,288 households, by which time Behabad District had been separated from the county to become Behabad County. At the 2016 census, the county's population was 50,845 in 15,156 households.

Administrative divisions

The population history and structural changes of Bafq County's administrative divisions over three consecutive censuses are shown in the following table. The latest census shows one district, three rural districts, and one city.

References

External links
Bafq entry in Encyclopaedia Iranica

 

Counties of Yazd Province